The Dolphin Catfish, (Hypophthalmus fimbriatus), is a species of demersal potamodromous catfish of the family Pimelodidae that is native to Santarém and the Negro River basin of Brazil and Venezuela.

Description
It grows to a length of 30.0 cm. Clearly distinguished by elongate, flat and thick mental barbels. Caudal fin deeply forked.

Ecology
It inhabits mostly blackwater rivers. It is largely zooplanktivorous specially cladocerans.

References

External links
Morphological development of Hypophthalmus fimbriatus and H. marginatus post-yolk-sac larvae (Siluriformes: Pimelodidae)

Pimelodidae
Catfish of South America
Fish described in 1858